"I'll Pin a Note on Your Pillow" is a song written by Carol W. Berzas Jr., Don Goodman and Nelson Larkin, and recorded by American country music artist Billy Joe Royal.  It was released in October 1987 as the first single from the album The Royal Treatment.  The song reached number 5 on the Billboard Hot Country Singles & Tracks chart.

Chart performance

References

1987 singles
Billy Joe Royal songs
Atlantic Records singles
Songs written by Don Goodman (songwriter)
Songs written by Nelson Larkin
1987 songs